Halimeh Jan (also Romanized as Ḩalīmeh Jān; also known as Halīmjān and Khalimdzhakh) is a village in Blukat Rural District, Rahmatabad and Blukat District, Rudbar County, Gilan Province, Iran. At the 2006 census, its population was 741, in 176 families.

References 

Populated places in Rudbar County